Loddo or Løddo is a mountain in the municipality of Austevoll in Hordaland county, Norway.

See also
List of mountains of Norway

References

Austevoll
Mountains of Vestland